Moritz Brosch (7 April 1829 – 14 July 1907) was a German Bohemian historian and professional English scholar.  He was born on 7 April 1829 in Prague, Bohemia, Austrian Empire which is now in the Czech Republic.  He was educated in Prague and Vienna, and became a journalist. Later he devoted himself to historical study, and he died on 14 July 1907 at Venice, where he had resided for over thirty years.

Works 
To the series Geschichte der europäischen Staaten Brosch contributed England 1509–1550 (6 vols., Gotha, 1884–1899), a continuation of the work of J.M. Lappenberg and R. Pauli, and Der Kirchenstaat (Gotha, 1880–1882). He gave further proof of his interest in English history by writing Lord Bolingbroke und die Whigs und Tories seiner Zeit (Frankfort, 1883), and Oliver Cromwell und die puritanische Revolution (Frankfort, 1886). He also wrote Julius II. und die Gründung des Kirchenstaats (Gotha, 1878), while one of his last pieces of work was to contribute a chapter on "The height of the Ottoman power" to vol. iii of the Cambridge Modern History (1904).

See also 
 Bohemia

References

Further reading 
 A. W. Ward in the English Historical Review, vol. xxii. (1907).

19th-century German historians
German people of German Bohemian descent
Writers from Prague
1829 births
1907 deaths
German male non-fiction writers